Britain's Lost Routes with Griff Rhys Jones is a British documentary television series broadcast on BBC One.  It is about the history of travel routes through Great Britain and is presented by Griff Rhys Jones. It was made by Griff Rhys Jones production company 'Modern Television'. Rhys Jones was nominated for the 'Presenter' BAFTA Cymru Award for his role in the series, while the cameraman Tudor Evans was nominated for 'Photography Factual'.

Episode list

References

External links 

2010s British documentary television series
2012 British television series debuts
2012 British television series endings
BBC high definition shows
BBC television documentaries about history
British travel television series
British television miniseries
English-language television shows